NGC 142 is a spiral galaxy in the constellation of Cetus. It was discovered by Frank Muller in 1886.

References 

Cetus (constellation)
Barred spiral galaxies
0142
01901